Akebia apetala is a species of the Lardizabalaceae family. It has only been found in Northwestern China.

Description 
Akebia apetala has woody climbing vines with grayish brown steams.  Leaflets come in 5 - 7, obovate-elliptic to oblong, 3--7.5 × 1.5--4 cm, described as less than leathery, almost papery and dark green. The fruit is yellow, ellipsoid to oblong with a smooth outer surface rind. The fruit splits open at maturity revealing the inner flesh.

References 

Lardizabalaceae
Plants described in 1992
Flora of China